Leningrad is a former name of St. Petersburg, Russia.

Leningrad  may also refer to:

Places
Leningrad Oblast, a federal subject of Russia, around Saint Petersburg
Mu'minobod, Tajikistan (former name)
2046 Leningrad, an asteroid named after Leningrad

Music
Leningrad (band), Russian ska/punk band
Symphony No. 7 (Shostakovich) (Op. 60), a symphony by Shostakovich, subtitled Leningrad
"Leningrad" (song), 1989 song by Billy Joel
Leningrad, track 3 on The Storyman, 2006 album by Chris de Burgh
Leningrad, track 6 on the Leningrad Cowboys album Go Space

Ships
Soviet helicopter carrier Leningrad, 1968 naval vessel
Leningrad-class destroyer, Soviet Navy destroyers in service 1936–1963

Other
Leningrad, a ZX Spectrum clone
Leningrad Military District, of the Russian Armed Forces
 Leningrad: The Advance of Army Group North, Summer 1941, a 1980 board wargame about the 1941 battle for the city

See also

List of places named after Vladimir Lenin
Leningradsky (disambiguation)

Petrograd (disambiguation)